John Sanborn may refer to:

 John B. Sanborn (1826–1904), Union Army general
 John B. Sanborn Jr. (1883–1964), judge, U.S. Court of Appeals for the Eighth Circuit
 John C. Sanborn (1885–1968), Idaho congressman
 John Sewall Sanborn (1819–1877), Canadian senator
 John Sanborn (media artist) (born 1954), American video artist
 John Robbins Sanborn (1839–1914), farmer and political figure in Quebec
 John Sanborn, a character in the TV series Revolution
 John Paul Sanborn B.Sc. Landscape Ecologist, ISA Certified Arborist,TRAQ,CTSP